The South African Railways Class 3  of 1909 was a steam locomotive from the pre-Union era in the Colony of Natal.

In 1909, the Natal Government Railways placed the world’s first true Mountain type locomotive in service when five Class B  tender locomotives were commissioned. Another 25 were placed in service in 1911. In 1912, when they were assimilated into the South African Railways, they were renumbered and designated Class 3. The Mountain wheel arrangement went on to become the most numerous steam locomotive wheel configuration in use in South Africa.

Manufacturer
With increasing coal traffic in Natal, the demand arose for more powerful locomotives. The Class B of 1909, also known as the Hendrie D, was a heavy  locomotive, designed by Natal Government Railways (NGR) Locomotive Superintendent D.A. Hendrie. They entered service in October 1909 and were put to work to handle coal traffic on the upper Natal mainline.
	

The locomotive design was based on Hendrie's Class B  in its modified form of 1906 as the Altered Hendrie B . This time, however, Hendrie made full use of the potential of the pony truck under the cab to carry additional weight by positioning the firebox to the rear of the driving wheels, which made an improved grate and ashpan possible. To accomplish this, the plate frame was equipped with a bridle casting at the rear to accommodate the larger firebox. Five locomotives were built by the North British Locomotive Company (NBL) and delivered in 1909, numbered in the range from 330 to 334.

The first five locomotives were delivered with the first Type TJ tenders, which had a  coal and  water capacity. They proved to be highly successful in use, which led to an order for another 25 locomotives from NBL in 1910. These were delivered in 1911 and numbered in the range from 345 to 369 on the NGR roster. They were identical to the first batch of engines in all respects, except that they had Type TM tenders, which had an  coal and  water capacity.

Characteristics
The locomotives were equipped with Pyle National Electric headlights. They were the world's first true Mountain type tender locomotives, having been designed and built with a  wheel arrangement with the firebox positioned to the rear of the driving wheels. Earlier Natal  locomotives were modified from a different original wheel arrangement.

The boilers which were used on these locomotives were, at the time, the largest in South Africa. Like the altered NGR Class B of 1906 on which it was based, these loco­motives used saturated steam and had plate frames. They used Walschaerts valve gear with flat "D" gunmetal type valves, which were arranged above the cylinders and controlled by the Hendrie-designed steam reversing gear. Since they were built without superheaters, the bore of their slide valves were  larger than those on the altered Class B of 1906 to compensate for the additional weight of the locomotive.

It was fed by two injectors, arranged on the underside of the footplate at the sides, with the combination valves placed on the back of the firebox. It had a finger bar firegrate which was operated by hand lever from the cab.

South African Railways
When the Union of South Africa was established on 31 May 1910, the three Colonial government railways (Cape Government Railways, NGR and Central South African Railways) were united under a single administration to control and administer the railways, ports and harbours of the Union. Although the South African Railways and Harbours came into existence in 1910 with Sir William Hoy appointed as its first General Manager, the actual classification and renumbering of all the rolling stock of the three constituent railways were only implemented with effect from 1 January 1912.

Obsolete locomotives included, altogether 1,460 engines of 70 different types had to be classified and renumbered. Prior to Union, locomotive designs for the constituent railways primarily had to meet local requirements since there had been no through running of engines between them. Union required a more general policy, even though local characteristics such as severity of gradients and curvature and permissible axle loads would never make it possible to produce a standard type of locomotive which would be capable of meeting all requirements. Nevertheless, standardisation was necessary on the new South African Railways (SAR) and Hoy estimated that fifteen standard locomotive types would be sufficient to cover all the varying conditions.

In March 1911, one of these new NGR locomotives, no. 368 of the 1911 batch, was used during comparative testing between locomotives of the constituent railways. It was brought up from Natal for testing against the Class 11 on the Witbank-Germiston coal line.

In 1912, these thirty Class B locomotives were renumbered in the range from 1446 to 1475 and designated  on the SAR.

Watson Standard boilers
In the 1930s, many serving locomotives were reboilered with a standard boiler type, designed by then Chief Mechanical Engineer A.G. Watson, as part of his standardisation policy. Such Watson Standard reboilered locomotives were reclassified by adding an "R" suffix to their classification number.

When 29 of the Class 3 locomotives, all except no. 1457, were eventually reboilered with superheated Watson Standard no. 2 boilers, they were therefore reclassified to Class 3R. Their original Belpaire boilers were fitted with Ramsbottom safety valves, while the Watson Standard boilers were fitted with Pop safety valves. The most obvious visual difference between an original and a Watson Standard reboilered locomotive is usually a rectangular regulator cover on the smokebox of the reboilered locomotive just to the rear of the chimney, but this was not always the case, as illustrated below. In the case of the Class 3R locomotive, an even more obvious visual distinction is the absence of the Belpaire firebox hump between the cab and the boiler.

Locomotives usually had their slide valves replaced with piston valves upon being fitted with superheated Watson Standard boilers, but the Class 3R retained their slide valves throughout their working lives.

By the late 1960s, towards the end of their service lives, the Class 3 was distributed between the Orange Free State and the Cape Western systems. By this time, they were all used on shunting and pickup service, mainly around Bloemfontein, Beaufort West, Touws River and Cape Town. By 1970, the entire Class was concentrated in the Cape Western region. Despite their small  coupled wheels, they could handle  with ease and became the preferred power for Bellville haulers until the Class 14CRB took over this service. The Class 3 were finally withdrawn from service in 1974.

Works numbers and renumbering
The Class 3 works numbers, years built, numbering and SAR classification are listed in the table.

Preservation
One Class 3 hasdsurvived into preservation.

Illustration
The main picture shows NGR Class B no. 334, later SAR Class 3R no. 1450, as built with a Belpaire firebox and Type TJ tender. Both of the following pictures show Watson Standard reboilered Class 3R locomotives with modified Type TJ tenders. The first has the usual spotting feature of a Watson Standard reboilered locomotive, the rectangular regulator cover just to the rear of the chimney, while the second has a bolted on cover plate instead, flush with the smokebox top.

References

1230
1230
1230
4-8-2 locomotives
2D1 locomotives
NBL locomotives
Cape gauge railway locomotives
Railway locomotives introduced in 1909
1909 in South Africa
Scrapped locomotives